Aeryon Scout is a small reconnaissance unmanned aerial vehicle (UAV) that was designed and built by Aeryon Labs of Waterloo, Ontario, Canada. The vehicle was developed between 2007 and 2009 and produced from 2009-2015. Production has been completed and it is no longer advertised for sale on the company website.

The Scout is a vertical take-off and landing VTOL quadcopter requiring no launch equipment. It can hover in a fixed position and weighs  without payload.

Design and development 
The Scout is a quadcopter in layout, with four rotors mounted on booms and four landing gear legs. Payloads are mounted underneath the fuselage on a gimbal mount.

The Scout is controlled with a Tablet PC-based interface. This system differs from the customary method of joystick control in allowing users to operate the vehicle with minimal training. The Scout is piloted by pointing to an area on the map. Height is controlled using a scroll on the touch screen interface. The system operates using custom or commercially available map data in several formats including MrSID. Real-time maps can also be used during flight and the Scout can be flown real-time by the operator or pre-programmed to fly a series of GPS waypoints. The Scout constantly monitors external conditions such as wind speed, as well as internal functions, such as battery level, allowing it to make an automated decisions en route to return home, land immediately or hover and wait.

The Scout has a quick-change payload interface with common interfaces including USB and Ethernet, which allows custom payloads to be developed. The system is able to detect the type of payload connected, and configure it and operate it appropriately. Offered payloads include gimbal-mounted digital still and video cameras, a near-IR camera for remote sensing, a FLIR night-vision camera and a stabilized 10x Optical Zoom camera.

Operators
 BP
 Halton Regional Police Service
 Libyan National Liberation Army (National Transitional Council)
 Ontario Provincial Police
 Saudi Arabian Army

Specifications

See also

References

External links 

 

Scout
Airborne military robots
Quadrotors
Reconnaissance aircraft
Unmanned aerial vehicles of Canada
2000s Canadian helicopters